"Lighthouse" is a song by the Swedish acoustic duo Hearts & Colors (Philip Tillström and Nicolai Kjellberg). It was co-written by Sam Ellis and was first released on their YouTube account in April and was included on their first EP, Prologue, also as an acoustic version.

Andrelli remix
The song achieved greater success when it was remixed by Andrelli. This version was released on 11 November 2016 and charted in Sweden, Norway, and also reached the Ultratip chart in Belgium (in both Flanders and Wallonia).

Charts

Certifications

References

2016 songs
2016 singles
Songs written by Sam Ellis (songwriter)